The Guinness Book of Records lists 410 feature-length film and TV versions of William Shakespeares plays, making Shakespeare the most filmed author ever in any language.

, the Internet Movie Database lists Shakespeare as having writing credit on 1,500 films, including those under production but not yet released. The earliest known production is King John from 1899.

Comedies

All's Well That Ends Well

As You Like It

The Comedy of Errors

Love's Labour's Lost

Measure for Measure

The Merchant of Venice

The Merry Wives of Windsor

A Midsummer Night's Dream

Much Ado About Nothing

The Taming of the Shrew

Twelfth Night

The Two Gentlemen of Verona

Tragedies

Antony and Cleopatra

Coriolanus

Hamlet

Julius Caesar

King Lear

Macbeth

Othello

Romeo and Juliet

Timon of Athens

Titus Andronicus

Troilus and Cressida

Histories

Henry IV, Part 1

Henry IV, Part 2

Henry V

Henry VI, Part 1

Henry VI, Part 2

Henry VI, Part 3

Henry VIII

King John

Richard II

Richard III

Romances

Pericles

Cymbeline

The Winter's Tale

The Tempest

Other

Shakespeare as a character

Acting Shakespeare

Television series 
NOTE: "ShakespeaRe-Told", "The Animated Shakespeare" and "BBC Television Shakespeare" series have been covered above, under the respective play performed in each episode.
 Playing Shakespeare (TV, UK, 1979–1984) began as two consecutive episodes of the UK arts series The South Bank Show, and developed into a nine-part series of its own. It features director John Barton, then a leading light of the Royal Shakespeare Company, putting a host of actors through their paces. Many of those actors are now household names, including Judi Dench, Michael Pennington, Patrick Stewart, Ben Kingsley, David Suchet and Ian McKellen. The episodes were:
The South Bank Show: "Speaking Shakespearean Verse"
The South Bank Show: "Preparing to Perform Shakespeare"
1. "The Two Traditions"
2. "Using the Verse"
3. "Language and Character"
4. "Set Speeches and Soliloquies"
5. "Irony and Ambiguity"
6. "Passion and Coolness"
7. "Rehearsing the Text"
8. "Exploring a Character"
9. "Poetry and Hidden Poetry"
Three further episodes were filmed but never edited or screened. They were to be called "Using the Prose", "Using the Sonnets" and "Contemporary Shakespeare". Their text can be read in the book "Playing Shakespeare" by John Barton.
 The Shakespeare Sessions (USA 2003): An American spin-off from Playing Shakespeare (above) in which John Barton directs notable American actors in Shakespeare scenes.
 Conjuring Shakespeare (TV, UK, 199?): A series of half-hour documentaries hosted by Fiona Shaw, each episode dealing with scenes from a particular play.
 In Search of Shakespeare (TV, UK, 2003): A BBC documentary series of four 1-hour episodes, chronicling the life of William Shakespeare, written and presented by Michael Wood.
 Slings & Arrows (TV, Canada, 2003–2006): A Canadian comedy drama set in the New Burbage Shakespeare Festival, a fictional Shakespearean festival in a small town in Canada comparable to the real-life Stratford Shakespeare Festival. With its entire run written by Susan Coyne, Bob Martin and Mark McKinney, directed by Peter Wellington, and starring Paul Gross, Martha Burns and Stephen Ouimette, it aired in three seasons of six 1-hour episodes each.
 Som & Fúria (TV, Brazil, 2009): A Brazilian adaptation of Slings and Arrows.

Academic 
 The "Themes of Shakespeare" series contains straight-to-video short documentaries, each considering the theme of a particular play. The contributors are Professor Stanley Wells, and Dr. Robert Smallwood of the Shakespeare Birthplace Trust.
 Two lecture series given by professor Peter Saccio were filmed and are commercially available on DVD.

Miscellaneous 
Theatre of Blood (UK, 1973). Vincent Price plays a Shakespearean actor who takes poetic revenge on the critics who denied him recognition. He kills his critics using methods inspired by several of Shakespeare's plays: Julius Caesar, Troilus and Cressida, The Merchant of Venice, Richard III, Othello, Cymbeline, Romeo and Juliet, Henry VI Part One, Titus Andronicus, and King Lear.
Douglas Hickox director
Vincent Price as Edward Lionheart
Diana Rigg as Edwina Lionheart
 The Complete Works of William Shakespeare (Abridged) by the Reduced Shakespeare Company is a successful West End stage comedy, containing some element of all 37 canonical plays. A film of one of the live performances is commercially available.
 The Royal Shakespeare Company have released a number of videos in the "Great Performances" series, which contain excerpts from stage performances.
The Lion in Winter (US, Play, 1966). Set during Christmas 1183 at Henry II of England's castle in Chinon, Anjou, Angevin Empire, the play opens with the arrival of Henry's wife Eleanor of Aquitaine, whom he has had imprisoned since 1173. The story concerns the gamesmanship between Henry, Eleanor, their three surviving sons Richard, Geoffrey, and John, and their Christmas Court guest, the King of France, Philip II Augustus (French: Philippe Auguste), who was the son of Eleanor's ex-husband, Louis VII of France (by his third wife, Adelaide). Also involved is Philip's half-sister Alais, who has been at court since she was betrothed to Richard at age eight, but has since become Henry's mistress. A film version was made in 1968. Productions have been put on by Shakespearean Theater companies (Unseam'd Shakespeare Company production in 2002 and the American Shakespeare Center's Blackfriars Playhouse presented it in complementary repertory with William Shakespeare's King John in 2012).
Anthony Harvey director
Peter O'Toole as King Henry II
Katharine Hepburn as Queen Eleanor
Anthony Hopkins (in his motion picture debut) as Richard the Lionheart
Nigel Terry as John
Timothy Dalton (in his motion picture debut) as King Philip II

See also
 List of titles of works taken from Shakespeare

Notes and references

Notes

References

Sources

Further reading

External links 
 
 BardMovies: Shakespeare on Film for Groundlings
 ShakespeareFlix: Shakespeare Observations, Reviews, News, and Resources
 An International Database of Shakespeare on Film, Television and Radio
 Shakespeare on Screen, An International Filmography and Videography

 
Shakespeare
Shakespeare
Shakespeare
Shakespeare